Steve Yockey is an American playwright, producer and screenwriter. He is known as the developer of the HBO Max comedy-drama television series The Flight Attendant, which was an adaptation of the 2018 novel of the same name.

Yockey began his career in 2014, when he wrote an episode for the television series Awkward. He later produced and wrote for Supernatural. He left the series in 2019 to work on his own television series The Flight Attendant. In 2021, Yockey was nominated for two Primetime Emmy Awards in the categories Outstanding Comedy Series and Outstanding Writing for the episode "In Case of Emergency" at the 73rd Primetime Emmy Awards. More recently, Yockey signed a multi-year overall deal with Warner Bros. Television.

Filmography

References

External links 

Living people
Year of birth missing (living people)
American dramatists and playwrights
American male screenwriters
American television writers
American male television writers
American television producers
21st-century American screenwriters